The Bears Lagoon Serpentine Football Club is an Australian Rules Football club which competes in the LVFL in Victoria, Australia.

The club, known as the Bears Lagoon Serpentine Bears, represents the localities of Bears Lagoon and Serpentine and has participated in the LVFL since 1945.

The Bears have appeared in many grand finals, winning twelve; the most recent in 1995.

Location

History

Success (1945 - 1995)
BLS has won twelve premierships in the LVFL and is the third most successful team in the league by premierships however hasn't has success since 1995. The team also finished as wooden spooners at the end of the 2016 season.

Rivalries
Because of the small sized football league rivalries are few and far between and most teams aren't overly aggressive towards each other, however BLS's main rivals are Bridgewater, Newbridge & Pyramid Hill.

Honours

Premierships

References

Australian rules football clubs in Victoria (Australia)